Hedwig Bleibtreu (23 December 1868 – 24 January 1958) was an Austrian film actress. She appeared in more than thirty films from 1919 to 1952. Bleibtreu is perhaps best-known to international audiences as Alida Valli's furious landlady in The Third Man (1949). From 1893 to 1956, she played at the Burgtheater in Vienna. Hedwig Bleibtreu is the great aunt of actress Monica Bleibtreu, and the great-great aunt of Monika's son actor Moritz Bleibtreu.

Filmography

References

External links
 

1868 births
1958 deaths
Actors from Linz
Austrian film actresses
Austrian silent film actresses
Austrian stage actresses
20th-century Austrian actresses